John Paul Jr. (December 9, 1883 – February 13, 1964) was a United States representative from Virginia, and later a United States district judge of the United States District Court for the Western District of Virginia.

Education and career
Born on December 9, 1883, in Harrisonburg, Rockingham County, Virginia, Paul attended both private and public schools. He received a Bachelor of Arts in 1903 from the Virginia Military Institute and Bachelor of Laws in 1906 from University of Virginia School of Law and was admitted to the bar in 1906. He was an instructor at the Virginia Military Institute in 1903 and 1904. He was in private practice in Harrisonburg from 1907 to 1917, and from 1924 to 1929. He was a member of the Senate of Virginia from 1911 to 1915, and from 1919 to 1922. He was an unsuccessful candidate for the United States House of Representatives from Virginia in 1916 and 1918. He served in the United States Army with the Three Hundred and Thirteenth Field Artillery of the One Hundred and Fifty-fifth Field Artillery Brigade, being in the American Expeditionary Forces from May 1918 to May 1919. He was a major. He was the city attorney for Harrisonburg from 1919 to 1923.

Congressional service

Paul successfully contested as a Republican the election of Thomas W. Harrison to the United States House of Representatives of the 67th United States Congress and served from December 15, 1922, to March 3, 1923. He was an unsuccessful candidate for reelection in 1922 to the 68th United States Congress. He was a delegate to the Republican National Conventions in 1912, 1916, 1920, and 1924.

Later career

Paul was a special assistant to the Attorney General of the United States from 1923 to 1924. He was the United States Attorney for the Western District of Virginia from 1929 to 1932.

Federal judicial service

Paul was nominated by President Herbert Hoover on December 15, 1931, to a seat on the United States District Court for the Western District of Virginia vacated by Judge Henry C. McDowell Jr. He was confirmed by the United States Senate on January 11, 1932, and received his commission on January 14, 1932. He served as Chief Judge from 1948 to 1958. He assumed senior status on August 1, 1958. His service terminated on February 13, 1964, due to his death in Ottobine, Rockingham County, Virginia. He was interred in Woodbine Cemetery in Harrisonburg.

Absalom Willis Robertson, despite his affiliation with Byrd, called Paul a dispenser of even handed justice.

Notable cases

Paul presided over the 50-day trial of the Franklin County moonshine conspiracy, said to be the longest trial in Virginia history to that time.

To Paul and his colleagues fell the task of implementing the Supreme Court's decision in Brown v. Board of Education in desegregation lawsuits in the Western District of Virginia. In August 1956, Paul issued a historic ruling ordering the desegregation of the Charlottesville public schools, and which soon set off Massive Resistance as by-now-United States Senator Harry F. Byrd vehemently disagreed with the United States Supreme Court ruling, and state officials obstructed its implementation. Paul also sat on the 3-judge panel that ordered the integration of the graduate schools of the University of Virginia in the Gregory Swanson case. He also ordered the desegregation of the schools in Grayson County, and Warren County.

Farm

In addition to his judicial service, Paul operated his farm in Rockingham County.

Family

Paul's father, John Paul, was also a United States Representative from Virginia and a United States District Judge of the United States District Court for the Western District of Virginia.

Land donation

In 1961, Paul donated part of his family's farm to become the Paul State Forest.

References

Sources

External links
 University of Virginia Law School, Register of the Papers of Judge John Paul 1930–1964

1883 births
1964 deaths
Republican Party Virginia state senators
United States Attorneys for the Western District of Virginia
Judges of the United States District Court for the Western District of Virginia
United States district court judges appointed by Herbert Hoover
20th-century American judges
Virginia lawyers
University of Virginia School of Law alumni
Virginia Military Institute alumni
United States Army officers
Republican Party members of the United States House of Representatives from Virginia